Berumerfehn is part of the municipality Großheide in the district of Aurich, in Lower Saxony, Germany.

History

Early years 
Berumerfehn was founded in 1794 by the Fehnkompanie of Norden. The Fehnkompanie was a peat digging company of people from Norden and Hage.

By this time the village was named Norderfehn, because it was the only settlement founded inside the peat (Lower German: fehn) by of people from Norden.

Later the name of the village changed to Berumerfehn because of the close distance to Berum

20th century 
In 1972 Berumerfehn got incorporated into the municipality of Großheide.

21st century 
On August 16, 2021 an F2 T5 tornado hit Berumerfehn and damaged about 50 houses.

References 

Aurich (district)
Lower Saxony